Microlepidogaster longicolla is a species of armored catfish endemic to the upper reaches of the rio São Bartolomeu, a tributary to the rio Corumbá, itself a tributary to the rio Paranaíba of the upper rio Paraná basin near Brasília in central Brazil.

References

Otothyrinae
Catfish of South America
Fish of Brazil
Endemic fauna of Brazil
Taxa named by Bárbara Borges Calegari
Taxa named by Roberto Esser dos Reis
Fish described in 2010